The Burdette Building, also known as Burdette Hardware Building or B.W. Burdette Building, in Simpsonville, South Carolina, was listed on the U.S. National Register of Historic Places in 2003.

It is a two-story building with brick walls laid in running bond, interrupted by pilasters.  It was built in 1921 to replace the wood frame and brick building on the same site which had been destroyed by a fire.  It was the largest building in Simpsonville and it stimulated the commercial economy which otherwise was waning.

References

Commercial buildings on the National Register of Historic Places in South Carolina
National Register of Historic Places in Greenville County, South Carolina
Simpsonville, South Carolina